Keminmaa (until 1979 Kemin maalaiskunta) is a municipality of Finland.

The municipality has a population of 
which 
is water. The population density is
.

Geography
Neighbouring municipalities are Kemi, Simo, Tervola and Tornio.

Villages
 Hirmula
 Ilmola
 Itäkoski
 Jokisuu
 Laurila
 Lautiosaari
 Liedakkala
 Maula
 Pörhölä
 Ruottala (mostly on Tornio's territory)
 Sompujärvi
 Törmä
 Viitakoski

Coat of arms
Blazon: Gules with a springing Silver salmon, holding a padlock in its mouth.

Notable people
 Peter Franzén, Finnish actor
 Ari Koch, Finnish sculptor
 Veikko Lesonen, Finnish businessman and investor
 Taavetti Lukkarinen, former foreman of Kemi Oy; convicted to death and hanged for treason
 Markus Pessa, Finnish Emeritus professor at the Tampere University of Technology and the founder and former director of the Optoelectronics Research Centre at that same university.
 Joonas Piippola, Finnish ballroom dancer, dance teacher and choreographer
 Tomi Putaansuu, the Finnish singer of band Lordi, lived in Keminmaa when he was a child
 Nicolaus Rungius, local 17th century vicar whose mummified body is nowadays a tourist attraction in Keminmaa church
 Hannu Tihinen, Finnish football player
 Otto Vallenius, Finnish opera singer and painter
 Paavo Väyrynen, Finnish politician

References

External links

Municipality of Keminmaa – Official website